Tucson Junior Strings is a string orchestra program for children and youth.  It was founded in 1968  and currently has over 300 members in six different levels of orchestras.  Students can participate if they have played a string instrument for at least a year and have not graduated from high school.  Dennis Bourret is the director since 1970.  All of the orchestras play without a conductor.  They play chamber music.  To participate in the highest orchestra, Chamber I, a student must be able to play in all of the positions and have a nice sounding vibrato.

Culture of Tucson, Arizona